Acanthoscelides floridae is a species of leaf beetle in the family Chrysomelidae. It is found in the Caribbean region, Central America, and North America.

References

Further reading

 
 

Bruchinae
Articles created by Qbugbot
Beetles described in 1873